Hope van Dyne (née Pym) is a fictional character portrayed by Evangeline Lilly in the Marvel Cinematic Universe (MCU) film franchise, loosely based on the Marvel Comics character Hope Pym. Portrayed as the daughter of Hank Pym and Janet van Dyne, she was a senior board member of her father's company, Pym Technologies, and later inherits the superhero identity of Wasp from her mother, using a suit containing shrinking technology to shrink to the size of an insect and also fly with insect-themed wings.

After rekindling her relationship with her father, Van Dyne and Pym work together to bring back Van Dyne's mother who was previously trapped in the Quantum Realm. After doing so, Van Dyne and her parents fall victim to the Blip. When the three are restored to life, Van Dyne joins the Avengers in a battle against an alternate Thanos. She later begins the Pym van Dyne Foundation, continues a relationship with Scott Lang, and becomes a step-mother to Cassie Lang. She is later trapped in the Quantum Realm alongside her family and works with them to defeat Kang the Conqueror.

She first appeared in the 2015 film Ant-Man and later in Ant-Man and the Wasp (2018), Avengers: Endgame (2019) and Ant-Man and the Wasp: Quantumania (2023). Lilly also appears in the Disney+ animated series What If...? (2021) as an alternate version of the character. She is noted for being the first superheroine to be a titular character in a MCU film, preceding Captain Marvel, Black Widow, and Shuri.

Concept and creation

Joss Whedon, the writer and director of The Avengers, originally intended to have the Wasp appear in the film due to potential scheduling conflicts preventing Scarlett Johansson from appearing in the film as Natasha Romanoff / Black Widow. Whedon wanted Zooey Deschanel to play the role of Wasp.

Evangeline Lilly was originally cast as the character in 2014, when Edgar Wright was slated to direct Ant-Man. When Wright left the film later in the year and was replaced by Peyton Reed, Lilly was reluctant to take the role until she read the revised script and got a chance to meet with Reed. Reed also offered contributions to the revised script, as did Lilly, who worked with Scott Lang-actor and co-screenwriter Paul Rudd, and contributed ideas to help flesh out her character, which received a fuller arc and more action sequences as a result. One of the important things for Reed when joining the film was emphasizing both Hope and Janet van Dyne more, given the Wasp being "a crucial part" of the Ant-Man comics. Lilly signed a multi-film contract with Marvel. Danielle Costa was responsible for visual effects stunts of the character.

Characterization and appearances
The character Van Dyne first appeared in Ant-Man (2015). Van Dyne is introduced in Ant-Man as the daughter of Hank Pym and Janet van Dyne and a senior board member of Pym Technologies who helps Darren Cross take over the company. Throughout the film, character progression brings Hope closer to becoming a hero. Lilly described her character as "capable, strong, and kick-ass", but said that being raised by two superheroes resulted in Hope being "a pretty screwed up human being [...] and the clear message sent by my name is that I'm not a big fan of my father and so I took my mother's name." She added that Van Dyne's "arc in the movie is trying to find a relationship" with Pym. Feige said that Van Dyne was the more obvious choice to take up the mantle of Ant-Man, being "infinitely more capable of actually being a superhero" than Lang, and that the reason she does not is because of Pym's experience with losing her mother, rather than sexism, which Feige felt would not be a problem for Pym in modern times. At the end of the film during a mid-credits scene, Van Dyne is offered a prototype for a new suit from her father in which she notes that it's "about damn time". 

In 2016, Kevin Feige revealed that Lilly was to appear as the Wasp in an original draft of the film Captain America: Civil War (2016), but her scenes were cut because "there were so many characters in Civil War that [they] didn't want to do her a disservice". Reed himself noted that "Scott almost did call Hope" but "the Russo brothers, along with their screenwriters Christopher Markus and Stephen McFeely, felt that there was too much story riding on the backs of too many characters to do justice to Wasp".

In October 2015, after the release of Ant-Man, Marvel Studios announced a sequel, titled Ant-Man and the Wasp, with a scheduled release date of July 6, 2018, with Lilly confirmed to reprise the role. She made her debut as the Wasp in Ant-Man and the Wasp (2018). In the film, Van Dyne takes on the Wasp mantle from her mother, for which her father outfits her with a similar suit. The writers were excited to properly introduce the character as the Wasp, showing her "power set, how she fights, and what are the injustices that matter to her". Lilly felt the character had "incredible satisfaction" in becoming the Wasp, "something that she has been waiting for her whole life, which is essentially an affirmation from her father". Her relationship with Lang was more complicated than in the first film, and included anger towards his actions during Captain America: Civil War. Lilly felt it was important that Hope "be an extremely empathetic and compassionate person" and "to always push for feminine qualities to be apparent when she is dealing with situations". In her fight sequences, Lilly wanted to move away from the more masculine Muay Thai and mixed martial arts style of fighting she learned for the first film, noting that Hope moves differently than a man, so her fights should have "elegance, grace and femininity" with "a signature style" young girls could enjoy and emulate. Lilly worked with the writers to help ensure Hope was able to "represent a modern woman" without becoming the stereotype of a motherly figure. Madeleine McGraw portrayed a younger version of Hope van Dyne.

In late 2016, two new Avengers films were announced to arrive in 2018 and 2019. Lilly confirmed that Hope van Dyne would appear in the second Avengers film (eventually titled Avengers: Endgame) saying that her character would not appear in the 2018 instalment (Avengers: Infinity War) in order to preserve her reveal as the Wasp in Ant-Man and the Wasp which was released the same year. The Wasp eventually appeared in the Battle of Earth in Avengers: Endgame (2019). In 2021, Lilly voiced an alternate version of Van Dyne in What If...?. She also reprised her role in the inspired media attraction of the MCU, Ant-Man and The Wasp: Nano Battle! in Hong Kong Disneyland.

Lilly reprised her role as titular superhero in Ant-Man and the Wasp: Quantumania which was released in the United States on February 17, 2023. On her role in the final instalment of the Ant-Man trilogy, Lilly noted that she was "really excited to have a chance to show a side of [Van Dyne] where she would make mistakes, she would be fragile, and she wouldn't always have the right answer". In the film, Van Dyne is shown to be in a good place in which Lilly noted "that she's been trying to get to for a long time", having healed her relationship with her father, succeeded in saving her mother, fallen in love with Scott and is now a step-mother to Cassie. In an interview with The Hollywood Reporter, Lilly noted that Hope didn't "change a lot in [Quantumania]" adding that "there wasn't somewhere [Van Dyne] needed to get to or go other than just to repair a little wound in her relationship with her mom". With her relationship with Cassie, Van Dyne "sees her as a little girl who needs coddling or protecting". Contrastingly, her relationship with her own mother at the beginning of the film is the polar opposite where Janet tires to protect Van Dyne by not letting her in.

Comics derivations

Precursors
In the comics, the superhero character, Wasp, was originally Janet van Dyne, who debuted in the anthology series Tales to Astonish #44 (June 19630, which was plotted by Stan Lee, scripted by H.E. Huntley, and drawn by Jack Kirby. She is Henry "Hank" Pym's partner, having become the Wasp to avenge the death of her father, scientist Vernon van Dyne. She co-starred in Tales to Astonish until #69 (1963–65), and was a founding member of the Avengers, appearing in the first issue and giving the team its name. Janet's role (alongside Hank Pym), is depicted as more of a supporting character within the MCU films who have used the superhero alias in the past, additionally she was depicted as the mother of Hope and the original Wasp within the MCU films. Instead Hope van Dyne is more loosely connected on the concept of Hope Pym, a similar (but more obscure) character who is also the daughter of Hank Pym and Janet van Dyne. She was portrayed as a supervillain who called herself the Red Queen from the MC2 lineup as published by Marvel Comics. Despite the same original name and same parents, they are very different from each other. Hope Pym was created by Tom DeFalco and Ron Frenz, and first appeared in A-Next #7 (April 1999).

Mainstream comic derived version 

Another inspired character that originally appeared in the mainstream Marvel Universe canon (Earth-616) and later in other continuities and Marvel media during the start of the All-New, All-Different Marvel launch starting in 2015 in the comic book issue of Free Comic Book Day 2016 Civil War II (July 2016) is a character called Nadia van Dyne (who was created after Van Dyne). She is the daughter of Hank Pym but with a different mother than of Van Dyne. She also becomes the Wasp within the comics. Her name "Nadia" is a Russian language translated name of "Hope".

Fictional character biography

Early life
As a child, Hope van Dyne grew up in San Francisco, California and is estranged from her father Hank Pym after he hides the circumstances of the disappearance of her mother Janet van Dyne and his subsequent cold and distant behavior towards her. She adopts her mother's maiden name and, as a board member of her father's company Pym Technologies, she was the deciding vote in casting out Pym as CEO.

Meeting Scott Lang

In 2015, however, Van Dyne seeks Pym's help to stop new CEO Darren Cross from replicating his Ant-Man shrinking technology with the Yellowjacket suit, which he plans to mass-produce as military hardware. Pym recruits convicted thief Scott Lang to become the new Ant-Man to steal the Yellowjacket from Cross. Van Dyne is against using Lang, believing herself to be the superior choice. However, she reluctantly helps train Lang to fully harness the Ant-Man suit's abilities. She then reconciles with her father after he reveals that her mother shrank herself and became trapped in the subatomic Quantum Realm during a mission with S.H.I.E.L.D. as the Wasp. After successfully aiding Lang in thwarting Cross' plans, Pym reveals to Van Dyne a new Wasp prototype suit and offers it to her.

Rescuing Janet and resurrection

In 2018, Van Dyne and Pym are now in hiding due to Lang's actions against the Sokovia Accords in 2016, and has cut ties with him. However, they seek his help after they discover a way to bring back Janet from the Quantum Realm, with Lang having seen dreams of Van Dyne's childhood experiences with her mother Janet. Van Dyne and Lang team up as Ant-Man and the Wasp, and rekindle their relationship as they fight to keep their quantum technology away from other rival parties, such as black market dealer Sonny Burch, as well as Ava Starr / Ghost and Bill Foster, who want to use it to cure Starr of her fatal molecular instability. After Pym successfully brings Janet back from the Quantum Realm, she has a heartfelt reunion. Afterwards, she meets Lang's daughter, Cassie Lang. Sometime later, she, her parents and Lang plan to harvest quantum energy to cure Starr's condition. However, Van Dyne and her parents disintegrate, leaving Lang trapped in the Quantum Realm for five years.

In 2023, Van Dyne is restored to life and is brought by Masters of the Mystic Arts to join the final battle against an alternate Thanos. A week after the battle, she, alongside her restored parents and Lang, attends Tony Stark's funeral. She then returns home and spends time with Lang and Cassie.

Exploring the Quantum Realm

After being revived from the Blip, Van Dyne starts the Pym van Dyne Foundation which utilizes the Pym Particles in new and innovative ways to advance humanitarian efforts. She continues her relationship with Lang, alongside furthering her role as a step-mother to Cassie. Van Dyne also holds resentment for her mother who refused to talk about her time spent in the Quantum Realm.

After being bailed out from jail by Van Dyne and Lang, Cassie reveales that during the Blip, she began to read Pym's work on the Quantum Realm and with the help of Pym and Van Dyne, created a device that could make contact with the Quantum Realm. Despite Janet's protests, upon opening the device, Van Dyne, Lang, Cassie, Pym and Janet are pulled into the Quantum Realm. Van Dyne, separated from Lang and Cassie, finds her parents and begins to explore the city inside the realm. The trio meet Lord Krylar, a former ally of Janet's, who reveals that things had changed since she left. He sells them out to the man with whom he works for, which causes the trio to fight Krylar's men, flee and steal his ship.

Encountering Kang

After confronting her mother, Janet reveals to Van Dyne that she is indirectly responsible for  Krylar's boss, Kang's, uprising of the realm, having helped rebuild his Multiversal Power Core after he was "exiled" before enlarging it beyond use. Van Dyne reconciles with her mother, noting that they must not let Kang escape the realm. The trio arrive at the enlarged Multiversal Power Core and Van Dyne goes in to save Scott, who had been captured by Kang and made a deal to save Cassie by helping him acquire the power core. Kang, however, retracts the deal he initially made with Scott, capturing Janet and destroying her ship with Pym on it.

Pym, who is saved by hyper-intelligent evolved ants, helps Van Dyne and Lang as they make their way back to Kang, in which they commence an uprising against Kang and his army with the help of Cassie, Janet and the rest of the Quantum Realm residents. While seemingly having beaten Kang, Van Dyne and her family manage to make their way back to their reality through a portal powered by Kang's Multiversal Power Core. However, Scott is pulled back into a fight with Kang. Van Dyne flies back through the portal to rescue Scott and the two manage to defeat him by destroying the power core and knocking him into it, causing him to be pulled into oblivion. Cassie reopens the portal on her end for Lang and Van Dyne to return home and the family happily resume their life.

Alternate versions

Several alternate versions of Van Dyne appear in the animated series What If...?, with Lilly reprising her role.

Death of the Avengers

In an alternate universe, Van Dyne was recruited as a S.H.I.E.L.D. agent by Nick Fury, but was killed during a mission in Odesa, Ukraine. Her death drives her father to get revenge on Fury by disrupting his recruitment mission for the Avengers Initiative.

Zombie outbreak

In an alternate 2018, Van Dyne succeeds in bringing her parents back from the Quantum Realm. However, Janet has been infected with a quantum virus which has subsequently turned her and Pym into a zombie. Within 24 hours, the virus spreads across the Northwestern United States with Van Dyne escaping and becoming one of the sole survivors of Earth.

After saving Bruce Banner, who was sent to Earth to warn humanity about Thanos, Van Dyne, alongside other survivors (including Peter Parker, Bucky Barnes, Okoye, Sharon Carter, Kurt, and Happy Hogan) leave their base in New York City and travel to Camp Lehigh where a cure is said to be in development. En-route to Camp Lehigh, the team are attacked and Van Dyne becomes infected. She sacrifices herself by turning giant to allow the others to escape and she carries the surviving team to the camp, eventually succumbing to the virius.

Other appearances
Since her inception within the Marvel Cinematic Universe, she has appeared in various other Marvel Comics based media as the Wasp. She has appeared in animated series that derived from Marvel Animation including Ant-Man, voiced by Melissa Rauch, Avengers Assemble, voiced by Kari Wahlgren, and Marvel Super Hero Adventures, voiced by Marlie Collins.

She also appears in a few crossover Marvel video games titles using the Wasp alias created by Marvel Games: Marvel Puzzle Quest, Lego Marvel Avengers, Lego Marvel Superheroes 2, Marvel Contest of Champions, Marvel: Future Fight, Marvel Avengers Academy and Marvel Strike Force.

Reception

Critical response
For her role in the first Ant-Man film AV Club writer Sam Barsanti noted that, "Hope is much more well-suited [...] to be a superhero than Paul Rudd's Scott Lang" but she didn't "get to do nearly as much stuff". Contrarily, for Ant-Man and the Wasp, Stephanie Zacharek, writing for Time, felt that "the focus on Lilly as a better hero than Rudd was just checking off boxes in the name of gender equality". Amon Warmann of Yahoo! News praised Lilly's voice role as Van Dyne in the fifth episode of What If...?, "What If... Zombies?!", feeling that she "gave the episode's strongest performance" and that "Hope's final act of going giant size for the first time in the MCU was beautifully played".

Van Dyne's role in Ant-Man and the Wasp was often received with higher praise than compared to the first film with Insider writer Kirsten Acuna noting that, "Wasp is even more enjoyable to watch on screen". She added that "not only can she build great tech, but she's also an expert at hand-to-hand combat" and that her and Lang "are pretty great to see working side by side". Vox writer Alex Abad-Santos agreed saying that in the sequel, "Lilly's Hope van Dyne was the smarter, tougher, better-trained character" and that "the movie fully acknowledges that Hope is the more adept superhero by letting her lead the way in these sequences".

Legacy 
In 2018, after appearing in Ant-Man and the Wasp, Van Dyne became the first superheroine to be a titular character in a Marvel Cinematic Universe film, preceding Carol Danvers in Captain Marvel, Natasha Romanoff in Black Widow and Shuri in Black Panther: Wakanda Forever. Amelia Rayne Kim of Screen Rant noted that Van Dyne becoming the Wasp "not only made sense for the narrative but it prevented her from being simply a supporting character or a love interest". Kim added that her titular introduction "broke down another barrier to the women of this universe achieving equal footing with its men".

On including the Wasp in the film's title for Ant-Man and the Wasp,  Peyton Reed called it "organic" for both characters, and noted the Wasp's final line in Ant-Man—'It's about damn time'—as "very much about her specific character and arc in that movie, but it is absolutely about a larger thing. It's about damn time: We’re going to have a fully realized, very  complicated hero in the next movie who happens to be a woman." Reed would also push to ensure the Wasp received equal publicity and merchandise for the film.

Accolades

See also
 Characters of the Marvel Cinematic Universe

Notes

References

External links
 Hope van Dyne on the Marvel Cinematic Universe Wiki
 

Marvel Comics American superheroes
Avengers (film series)
Ant-Man (film series)
Female characters in film
Fictional business executives
Fictional characters displaced in time
Fictional characters from San Francisco
Fictional characters who can change size
Fictional people from the 21st-century
Film characters introduced in 2015
Marvel Cinematic Universe characters
Marvel Comics female superheroes